Joseph Butterworth (1770 – 30 June 1826) was an English law bookseller and politician.

Life
He was son of the Rev. John Butterworth, a Baptist minister in Coventry, where he was born. At an early age he went to London, where he learned the law-book trade, and founded a large and lucrative establishment in Fleet Street, in which his nephew Henry Butterworth later worked.

Butterworth's house became a resort of the leading philanthropists of the day. There Lord Liverpool, John Shore, 1st Baron Teignmouth, William Wilberforce and Zachary Macaulay had discussions, and the first meetings of the British and Foreign Bible Society were held. Butterworth liberally supported many philanthropic and Christian institutions.

He was M.P. for Coventry from 1812 to 1818, and for Dover from 1820 to 1826, and gave independent support to the government of the day. He was a broad-minded Wesleyan, and in August 1819 was appointed general treasurer of the Wesleyan Methodist Missionary Society, a post he retained until his death. He died at his house in Bedford Square, London, 30 June 1826, aged 56.

Works
He was author of A General Catalogue of Law Books (1801).

References
Attribution

External links 
 

1770 births
1826 deaths
People from Coventry
Publishers (people) from London
Members of the Parliament of the United Kingdom for English constituencies
UK MPs 1812–1818
UK MPs 1820–1826
Members of Parliament for Coventry